Akbar Hussain (1 October 1917 – 2 June 1981) was a Bengali language novelist of Bangladesh.
He was born in the village of Kaya in Kumarkhali under Kushtia district.  His father's and mother's name is Hazi Abdul Ali and Majeda begum. His wife was Hashna Banu. Hussain is principally known for his  novel Abancchita.

Career 
After receiving a Bachelor of Arts (1941), he started writing.  At that time he wrote in Sondhani, Shikkha, Daily Azad and Nabajug. His first novel Abanchita gains huge popularity. After huge success of Abanchita, he writes accordingly ki Paini, Du diner Khelaghore and Mohmukti etc.

Writings

Novels 
 Abanchita (1950)
 Ki Paini (1952)
 Mohmukti (1953)
 Dheau Jage (1961)
 Alo Chhaya (Golpogrontho, 1964)
 Du diner Khelaghore (1965)
 Megh-Bijli-Badal (1968)
 Natun Prithibi (1974)
 Dostokhoto (1989)
 Ava O Tar Prothom Porush (1988)

References

Further reading
 Dr. Rakibul Hassan: Panchasher shahitye jonopriya Juboraj (Shomachaar, Dhaka, 2015) 
 Dr. Rakibul Hassan: Akbar Hussainer kathashahitya; Rupolok o Shilposhiddhi (Akkhar Prokashoni, Dhaka, 2013) 
 Dr. Rakibul Hassan: Bangla Janapriya Uponesher Dhara;Mir Mosharraf Hossain theke Akbar Hussain (Adorn Publication, Dhaka, 2011) 
 Dr. Rakibul Hassan: Kayai Rabindranath, Bagha Jatin ebong Praggojon (Botomul, Dhaka, 2008) 
 Dr. Rakibul Hassan: Gorai Nadir Paar (Adorn Publication, Dhaka, 2012) 

1917 births
1981 deaths
Bangladeshi male writers
People from Kushtia District